Kaspar Bernauer (~1385 — ~1450) — balneotherapist and barber surgeon, father of Agnes Bernauer.

Biography 
Kaspar Bernauer was born approximately in 1385, presumably in the town of Scuol in the historical Rhaetian enclave of Engiadina Bassa/Val Müstair Region, which escaped Celticisation, and was fluent in an archaic form of the Vallader dialect of Post-Rhaetian language. 

Nothing is known about his childhood and early youth. It is only known that when Kaspar was already a teenager, he moved with his family to Augsburg. In February 1428, Albert, the son of Ernest, Duke of Bavaria, came to Augsburg for a tournament, where he met Kaspar Bernauer and his daughter Agnes. There exists the following fantastic version of Kaspar's life. In the Blutenburg Castle barber surgeon Kaspar Bernauer after the drowning of his daughter Agnes Bernauer (1435) wrote the story of the castle and its inhabitants in his native Vallader dialect.

The castle was built in 1431–40 on the island "Würminsel" on the river Würm for Albert III, Duke of Bavaria and his first wife Agnes Bernauer in the tradition of the "Danube School of Architecture" using "dovetail" wall battlements for the castle walls. In 1440, Albert III refused the offered Bohemian crown in Prague in favor of the Habsburgs.

Notes 

Physicians from Augsburg
15th-century physicians
1450 deaths
1385 births